Appy may refer to:

 Christian Appy (born 1955), professor of history
 Appy, Ariège, a commune in the Ariège department of southwestern France
 Appy Awards, for popular applications for mobile devices
 Appy Entertainment, American videogames company
 Appy Fizz, Indian soft drink

See also
 AppyParking, British parking technology company